Patrick Scott DiMarco (born April 30, 1989) is an American former football fullback in the National Football League (NFL). He was originally signed by the San Diego Chargers as an undrafted free agent in 2011. He played college football at South Carolina. He has also played for the Kansas City Chiefs, Atlanta Falcons, and Buffalo Bills. DiMarco is currently an analyst on the football staff at South Carolina.

Early life
DiMarco attended and played football at Lake Brantley High School in Altamonte Springs, Florida, where he played on both offense and defense. Rated a two-star recruit by Rivals.com and Scout.com, DiMarco was recruited by UCF, USF, Northwestern, Florida Atlantic, and South Carolina.

College career
DiMarco played college football at South Carolina from 2007 to 2010 under coach Steve Spurrier. At South Carolina, DiMarco played tight end and fullback. In four seasons, he recorded 38 receptions for 302 yards and six touchdowns.

Professional career

San Diego Chargers
DiMarco was signed by the Chargers as an undrafted free agent on July 26, 2011. He was released on August 7, 2011 after fracturing a bone in his foot.

Kansas City Chiefs
On August 2, 2012, DiMarco was signed by the Kansas City Chiefs. On May 2, 2013, the Chiefs released DiMarco.

Atlanta Falcons
On May 30, 2013, DiMarco was signed by the Atlanta Falcons. On February 24, 2015, he signed a two-year contract extension with the Falcons. In Week 5, against the New York Jets, he caught a 13-yard pass for his first career reception. In Week 4 of the 2014 season, he caught his first career touchdown pass in a 41–28 loss to the Minnesota Vikings. Leading into Week 4 of the 2015 NFL season, DiMarco was graded out as the best fullback in the NFL by Pro Football Focus grading. In Week 11, against the Indianapolis Colts, he had three receptions for 21 yards and two touchdowns for his first career multi-touchdown game. DiMarco won the Falcons' Walter Payton Man of the Year Award nominee for the 2015 Season. Pro Football Focus listed DiMarco as a First-team All-Pro fullback for 2015. In 2015, DiMarco was elected to his first Pro Bowl and was a second-team All-Pro. The Falcons would reach Super Bowl LI in the 2016 season. Against the New England Patriots, DiMarco had two receptions for 12 yards in the 34–28 overtime defeat.

Buffalo Bills
On March 9, 2017, DiMarco signed a four-year contract with the Buffalo Bills. In the 2017 season, DiMarco appeared in all 16 games and recorded nine starts to go along with seven receptions for 28 receiving yards. In the 2018 season, DiMarco appeared in all 16 games and recorded five starts to go along with three receptions for 62 receiving yards. In the 2019 season, DiMarco appeared in all 16 games and recorded four starts to go along with five receptions for 41 receiving yards.

On September 4, 2020, DiMarco was placed on injured reserve, and was released with an injury settlement four days later. On January 28, 2021, DiMarco announced his retirement from football.

Post-playing career
DiMarco joined the staff at his alma mater South Carolina in 2021 as an analyst and assistant director of football relations.

Personal life
DiMarco is the nephew of professional golfer Chris DiMarco.

References

External links

Buffalo Bills bio
South Carolina Gamecocks bio

1989 births
Living people
Players of American football from Florida
People from Altamonte Springs, Florida
Sportspeople from Seminole County, Florida
American football tight ends
American football fullbacks
Lake Brantley High School alumni
South Carolina Gamecocks football players
San Diego Chargers players
Kansas City Chiefs players
Atlanta Falcons players
Buffalo Bills players
Unconferenced Pro Bowl players
South Carolina Gamecocks football coaches